The Lipetsk Oblast Council of Deputies is the regional parliament of Lipetsk Oblast, a federal subject of Russia. A total of 42 deputies are elected for five-year terms.

Elections

2016

2021

Notes

References

Lipetsk Oblast
Politics of Lipetsk Oblast